Brassia is a genus of orchids  classified in the subtribe Oncidiinae. It is native to Mexico, Central America, the West Indies, and northern South America, with one species (B. caudata) extending into Florida.

The genus was named after William Brass, a British botanist and illustrator, who collected plants in Africa under the supervision of Sir Joseph Banks. Its abbreviation in the horticultural trade is Brs.

Description 
Brassia species and its popular hybrids are common in cultivation, and are notable for the characteristic long and spreading tepals (in some clones longer than 50 cm), which lend them the common name spider orchid. The grex Eternal Wind is a recipient of  the Royal Horticultural Society's Award of Garden Merit.

This epiphytic genus occurs in wet forests from sea level to altitudes under 1500 m, with the Peruvian Andes as its center of diversity. Occurrence is mostly restricted to a certain area, but Brassia caudata can be found over the whole geographic area.

They have large elliptic-oblong pseudobulbs with one or two leaves at the apex, lateral, unbranched  many-flowered inflorescences with small floral bracts. The lip is not attached to the column. The pollinarium shows a narrow stipe. There are two distichous, foliaceous sheaths around the base, from which the inflorescence emerges.

Brassia has a very specific method for pollination; it uses entomophily - pollination by insects - and in this case specifically by female spider-hunter wasps of the genera Pepsis and Campsomeris. Mistaken by the mimicry of Brassia, the wasp stings the lip, while trying to grasp its prey without any success. By these movements the wasp comes into contact with the pollinarium, that then sticks to its head. By flying to another Brassia flower, this flower gets pollinated.

List of species 
Species accepted as of May 2014:

 Brassia allenii L.O.Williams ex C.Schweinf. - Honduras, Panama
 Brassia andina (Rchb.f.) M.W.Chase - Colombia, Ecuador, Peru
 Brassia andreettae (Dodson) Senghas in F.R.R.Schlechter - Ecuador
 Brassia angusta Lindl. - Venezuela, Guyana, northern Brazil
 Brassia angustilabia Schltr. - Panama, Brazil (Amazonas)
 Brassia arachnoidea Barb.Rodr. - Rio de Janeiro 
 Brassia arcuigera Rchb.f. - Honduras, Costa Rica, Panama, Colombia, Venezuela, Ecuador, Peru 
 Brassia aurantiaca (Lindl.) M.W.Chase - Colombia, Venezuela, Ecuador
 Brassia aurorae D.E.Benn. - Peru 
 Brassia bennettiorum (Dodson) Senghas in F.R.R.Schlechter - Peru 
 Brassia bidens Lindl. - Venezuela, Guyana, northern Brazil
 Brassia bowmanii (Rchb.f.) M.W.Chase - Colombia
 Brassia brachypus Rchb.f. - Ecuador, Peru, Bolivia
 Brassia brevis (Kraenzl.) M.W.Chase - Colombia, Ecuador
 Brassia brunnea Archila - Guatemala
 Brassia caudata (L.) Lindl. - Mexico, Central America, Florida, Greater Antilles, Trinidad, northern South America
 Brassia cauliformis C.Schweinf. - Peru
 Brassia chloroleuca Barb.Rodr. - Guyana, French Guiana, Brazil
 Brassia chlorops Endrés & Rchb.f. - Nicaragua, Costa Rica, Panama
 Brassia cochleata Knowles & Westc. - northern South America
 Brassia cyrtopetala Schltr. - Colombia
 Brassia diphylla (H.R.Sweet) M.W.Chase - Colombia
 Brassia dresslerorum Archila - Guatemala
 Brassia ecuadorensis (Garay) M.W.Chase - Ecuador
 Brassia endresii (Kraenzl.) ined. (syn Solenidium endresii Kraenzl.) - Central America
 Brassia escobariana Garay - Colombia
 Brassia euodes Rchb.f. - Colombia, Ecuador, Peru
 Brassia farinifera Linden & Rchb.f. - Ecuador
 Brassia filomenoi Schltr. - Peru
 Brassia forgetiana Sander - Peru, Brazil, Venezuela
 Brassia garayana M.W.Chase - Ecuador, Peru
 Brassia gireoudiana  Rchb.f. & Warsz. - Costa Rica, Panama
 Brassia glumacea Lindl. - Colombia, Venezuela, Ecuador, Peru
 Brassia glumaceoides M.W.Chase - Colombia, Venezuela
 Brassia horichii (I.Bock) M.W.Chase - Costa Rica, Panama
 Brassia huebneri Schltr. - French Guiana, Brazil
 Brassia iguapoana Schltr. - Brazil (Amazonas)
 Brassia incantans (Rchb.f.) M.W.Chase - Colombia, Ecuador, Peru
 Brassia jipijapensis Dodson & N.H.Williams - Ecuador (Manabí)
 Brassia keiliana Rchb.f. ex Lindl. - Colombia, Venezuela, Guyana
 Brassia koehlerorum Schltr. - Peru
 Brassia lanceana Lindl. - Panama, Trinidad & Tobago, northern South America
 Brassia macrostachya Lindl. - Venezuela, Guyana
 Brassia maculata R.Br. in W.T.Aiton - Mexico, Central America, Cuba, Jamaica
 Brassia mendozae (Dodson) Senghas in F.R.R.Schlechter - Ecuador
 Brassia minutiflora (Kraenzl.) M.W.Chase - Colombia
 Brassia neglecta Rchb.f. - Guyana, Venezuela, Bolivia, Colombia, Ecuador, Peru 
 Brassia ocanensis Lindl. - Venezuela, Bolivia, Colombia, Ecuador, Peru 
 Brassia panamensis (Garay) M.W.Chase - Panama
 Brassia pascoensis D.E.Benn. & Christenson - Peru
 Brassia peruviana Poepp. & Endl. - Peru
 Brassia pozoi (Dodson & N.H.Williams) Senghas in F.R.R.Schlechter - Ecuador, Peru 
 Brassia pumila Lindl. - Guyana, Venezuela, French Guiana, Colombia, Peru, Brazil
 Brassia rhizomatosa Garay & Dunst - Venezuela, Peru
 Brassia rolandoi (D.E.Benn. & Christenson) M.W.Chase - Peru
 Brassia signata Rchb.f - Peru, Bolivia, Oaxaca, Guerrero
 Brassia suavissima Pupulin & Bogarín - Costa Rica
 Brassia sulphurea (Rchb.f.) M.W.Chase - Venezuela
 Brassia thyrsodes Rchb.f. - Bolivia
 Brassia transamazonica D.E.Benn. & Christenson - Peru
 Brassia verrucosa Bateman ex Lindl. - Mexico, Central America, Venezuela, Brazil
 Brassia villosa  Lindl. - Guyana, Venezuela, Brazil
 Brassia wageneri  Rchb.f. - Guyana, Venezuela, Brazil, Colombia, Peru 
 Brassia warszewiczii Rchb.f. - Ecuador

Intergeneric hybrids

 × Aliceara  (Brassia × Miltonia × Oncidium)
 × Bakerara  (Brassia × Miltonia × Odontoglossum × Oncidium)
 × Banfieldara (Ada × Brassia × Odontoglossum )
 × Brapasia (Aspasia × Brassia)
 × Brassada  (Ada × Brassia)
 × Brassidium (Brassia × Oncidium)
 × Brassochilus (Brassia × Leochilus)
 × Bratonia (Brassia × Miltonia)
 × Crawshayara  (Aspasia × Brassia × Miltonia × Oncidium)
 × Degarmoara (Brassia × Miltonia × Odontoglossum )
 × Derosaara (Aspasia × Brassia × Miltonia × Odontoglossum )
 × Duggerara (Ada × Brassia × Miltonia)
 × Eliara (Brassia × Oncidium × Rodriguezia)
 × Forgetara (Aspasia × Brassia × Miltonia)
 × Johnkellyara  (Brassia × Leochilus × Oncidium × Rodriguezia)
 × Maclellanara (Brassia × Odontoglossum × Oncidium)
 × Norwoodara (Brassia × Miltonia × Oncidium × Rodriguezia)
 × Odontobrassia (Brassia × Odontoglossum)
 × Pettitara (Ada × Brassia × Oncidium)
 × Rodrassia  (Brassia × Rodriguezia)
 × Rohriara  (Ada × Aspasia × Brassia)
 × Sauledaara (Aspasia × Brassia × Miltonia × Oncidium × Rodriguezia)
 × Shiveara (Aspasia × Brassia × Odontoglossum × Oncidium)
 × Wingfieldara  (Aspasia × Brassia × Odontoglossum)

This list does not include nothogenera based on genera that are synonyms of Oncidium, as for instance Cochlioda.  These nothogenera are now synonyms with other nothogenera in this list, or with Brassia (in the case of Brassioda = Brassia × Cochlioda).

Gallery

References

External links
 
 Pupulin, F. and Bogarin, D.: The genus Brassia in Costa Rica : A survey of four species and a new species ; Lindleyana, March 2005 - - On line 
April 2013 - - On line 
 Dressler, R.L., and N.H. Williams. 2003. New combinations in Mesoamerican Oncidiinae (Orchidaceae). Selbyana 24(1):44–45.
 van der Pijl, L., and C.H. Dodson. 1966. Orchid Flowers: Their Pollination and Evolution. University of Miami Press, Coral Gables.

 
Oncidiinae genera
Epiphytic orchids
Orchids of Florida
Orchids of Mexico
Orchids of South America
Orchids of Central America
Flora of the Caribbean